The Kara is a river draining to the Arctic Kara Sea in Russia. It flows through the Pai-Khoi Range in the Polar Ural region, and forms parts of the borders between the Yamalo-Nenets Autonomous Okrug, the Nenets Autonomous Okrug and the Komi Republic.

The settlement of Ust-Kara is near the river mouth. The name of the river is derived from Nenets word meaning "hummocked ice".

References

Rivers of Yamalo-Nenets Autonomous Okrug
Rivers of Nenets Autonomous Okrug
Rivers of the Komi Republic
Drainage basins of the Kara Sea